Norton C. Joerg is a lawyer and retired Rear Admiral in the United States Navy.

Joerg is only the ninth navy reserve attorney to reach flag rank.

After his retirement Joerg was appointed to a senior position in the Periodic Review Secretariat.

References

United States Navy admirals
Living people
Year of birth missing (living people)